Begonia quadrialata is a species of flowering plant in the family Begoniaceae, with a native range from central Tropical Africa down to Angola. A molecular phylogenetic analysis published in 2004 indicates that B. quadrialata is most closely related to B. potamophila.

References

quadrialata
Plants described in 1895